Delfin Albano, officially the Municipality of Delfin Albano, is a 4th class municipality in the province of Isabela, Philippines. According to the 2020 census, it has a population of 29,928 people.

The municipality was formerly known as Magsaysay. It was named after the former congressman, Delfin Albano.

Etymology
On November 14, 1982, by virtue of Batas Pambansa Blg. 291, the municipality was renamed to its current name in honor of its native legislator, Congressman Delfin Albano.

History
On June 22, 1957, by virtue of Republic Act No. 2009, the barrios of San Antonio, San Juan, Ragan Sur, Ragan Norte, Ragan Almacen, San Jose (Bulo), San Patricio, Quibal, San Andres (Lattu), Calinawan Sur, Bayabo, Santor, Santo Rosario, Andarayan, Aneg, San Isidro, Maui, San Roque, Carmencita, Aga, Villa Pareda, Villaluz, San Pedro, Concepcion, San Macario and San Nicolas and the sitios of Turod, Paco, Calamagui and Kim-malabasa, were separated from the municipality of Tumauini to form the municipality of Magsaysay, in honor of President Ramon Magsaysay who died two months prior.

In 1982, a bill which seeks to change the name of the municipality from Magsaysay to Delfin Albano was filed in the congress. This is in honor of the late Delfin Albano who authored the Republic Act No. 2009 which created the municipality of Magsaysay. On November 14, 1982, Batasang Pambansa No. 291 was approved. The municipality formally celebrated and installed the name of Delfin Albano on October 1, 1983.

Geography
The town is bounded to the north by Santo Tomas, to the east by the Cagayan River shared with Tumauini, to the west by Quezon and Mallig, and to the south by Quirino, Ilagan City and the Mallig River.

Barangays
Delfin Albano is politically subdivided into twenty nine (29) barangays. These barangays are headed by elected officials: Barangay Captain, Barangay Council, whose members are called Barangay Councilors. All are elected every three years.

Climate

Land area and land use
The town occupies a total land area of 18,900 hectares, which is further subdivided to twenty nine (29) barangays. The total land area contains varied land use, which were developed in response to population and economic growth of the total land area, to wit: agriculture (59.04%), built-up areas (2.74%), forest (4.74%), open grass lands (30.15), and road and water bodies (3.33%).

Demographics

Economy

Government

Local government
The town is governed by a mayor designated as its local chief executive and by a municipal council as its legislative body in accordance with the Local Government Code. The mayor, vice mayor, and the councilors are elected directly by the people through an election which is being held every three years.

Elected officials

Congress representation
Delfin Albano, as a municipality, belongs to the first legislative district of the province of Isabela. The current representative is Hon. Antonio T. Albano.

Education
The Schools Division of Isabela governs the town's public education system. The division office is a field office of the DepEd in Cagayan Valley region. The office governs the public and private elementary and public and private high schools throughout the municipality.

See also
List of renamed cities and municipalities in the Philippines

References

External links
Municipal Profile at the National Competitiveness Council of the Philippines
Delfin Albano at the Isabela Government Website
Local Governance Performance Management System
[ Philippine Standard Geographic Code]
Philippine Census Information
Delfin Albano Isabela Website
Municipality of Delfin Albano

Municipalities of Isabela (province)
Populated places on the Rio Grande de Cagayan